Pelitkoyağı is a small village in Mezitli district  of Mersin Province, Turkey. (Mezitli district center is a part of Greater Mersin) . The population of the village  was 125  as of 2012.

References

Villages in Mezitli District